Otto Bauscher (16 November 1880 – 1959) was a British gymnast. He competed in the men's artistic individual all-around event at the 1908 Summer Olympics.

References

1880 births
1959 deaths
British male artistic gymnasts
Olympic gymnasts of Great Britain
Gymnasts at the 1906 Intercalated Games
Gymnasts at the 1908 Summer Olympics
Sportspeople from London